is a 1963 Japanese drama film directed by Shōhei Imamura. It was entered into the 14th Berlin International Film Festival, where Sachiko Hidari won the Silver Bear for Best Actress award. It was also awarded numerous national film prizes.

Plot
The film follows Tome, a young woman born to a rural lower-class family in the Tōhoku region in 1918, who, after a long series of mishaps, rises to the status of a madam in the post-war era. When she is sentenced to jail, her daughter Nobuko becomes her patron's lover, but later steals his money to use it for building up a farming commune.

Cast
 Sachiko Hidari as Tome Matsuki
 Jitsuko Yoshimura as Nobuko
 Emiko Aizawa as Rui
 Masumi Harukawa as Midori
 Emiko Higashi as Kane
 Daizaburo Hirata as Kamibayashi
 Seizaburo Kawazu as Karasawa
 Teruko Kishi as Rin
 Tanie Kitabayashi as Madam
 Kazuo Kitamura as Chuji
 Asao Koike as Sawakichi
 Masakazu Kuwayama as Owagawa En's Lover
 Hiroyuki Nagato as Matsunami
 Shoichi Ozawa as Ken
 Sumie Sasaki as En
 Taiji Tonoyama as Foreman
 Shigeru Tsuyuguchi as Honda

Production
In a 1977 interview, director Imamura explained that he had chosen Hidari for the role due to her vitality and energy, which had impressed him in the film The Maid's Kid (Jochukko, 1955). Yet, according to Hidari, she and Imamura disagreed profoundly on the way she should play her character, calling him a "chauvinist" in retrospect for his bullying the then pregnant actress by e.g. insisting on multiple re-takes in delicate scenes.

Release
The Insect Woman was released in Japan on 16 November 1963, earning $500,000 in four weeks. It was re-released with Getsuyōbi no Yuka in February 1964, earning a similar amount.

The film was released as a region 1 NTSC DVD in 2009 as part of The Criterion Collection's Shohei Imamura DVD box and as a region B Blu-ray in 2011 by Masters of Cinema.

Reception
Variety magazine declared the film being "potent adult film fare by any nation's standards" and praised the camera work by Masahisa Himeda and performances by Sachiko Hidari, Kazuo Kitamura and Jitsuko Yoshimura. The review noted that the film takes place over a period of 45 years in an episodic technique "consciously causing viewer alienation".

The film won 14 awards in Japan, including the Blue Ribbon Award for Best Film and Kinema Junpo Award for Best Film of the Year.

References

External links
 
 
 The Insect Woman: Learning to Crawl an essay by Dennis Lim at The Criterion Collection

1963 drama films
Japanese drama films
Japanese black-and-white films
Best Film Kinema Junpo Award winners
Films directed by Shohei Imamura
Nikkatsu films
1960s Japanese films